Zabara may refer to:

Emilian Zabara, a Romanian sprint canoer
Natan Ilyich Zabara, a Ukrainian writer of Yiddish literature
Olesya Zabara, a Russian triple jumper
Zabara (horse), a British racehorse
Zabara, Ukraine, a village in Zhytomyr Oblast, Ukraine